Al-Arabi Sports Club is a Syrian football club based in As-Suwayda. It was founded in 1972. They play their home games at the As-Suwayda Stadium.

References

Arabi
Association football clubs established in 1972
1972 establishments in Syria